Arshaq may refer to:
Arshaq District
Arshaq-e Gharbi Rural District
Arshaq-e Markazi Rural District
Arshaq-e Sharqi Rural District
Arshaq-e Shomali Rural District